Rust in Peace: Live is a live album by American heavy metal band Megadeth, released in 2010 through Shout! Factory in Blu-ray, DVD, and CD formats.  The release was in celebration of the 20th anniversary of the original release of Rust in Peace and it is the first Megadeth release since 2002's Rude Awakening to feature bassist David Ellefson.

Background

Rust in Peace was released in 1990 and entered the Billboard 200 at number 23, and was eventually certified platinum by the RIAA in 1992. Steve Huey of Allmusic wrote that the album was "easily Megadeth's strongest musical effort".

The album's reputation led the band to announce a "Rust in Peace 20th Anniversary Tour". The tour began on March 1, 2010 as a month-long North American tour with support from Testament and Exodus.

Filmed at the Hollywood Palladium on March 31, 2010, the performance showcases Megadeth's 1990 album, Rust in Peace played in its entirety with the same background that was featured on the original "Rust in Peace" tour. Both audio and video versions of the release charted domestically. The CD release of the album managed to chart at number 161 on the Billboard 200 chart upon its release. Meanwhile, the video version of the album hit number two on the Top Billboard 50 Music Videos chart.  As of April 2011, about 19,000 copies of the DVD have been sold in the U.S.

Reception

Rust in Peace Live received a generally positive response from critics. Chad Bowar, reviewing the DVD/Blu-ray version for About.com, praised the guitar interplay between Broderick and Mustaine, and the audio and video quality of the release. He suggested that the combination of one of the band's biggest album live in its entirety and the (then-)recent return of bassist David Ellefson made the album "essential" for fans of the band. Alex Young of Consequences of Sound gave a very positive review of Rust in Peace Live, though noting that it was released at a time to capitalize on the band's then recent tour with the other three of the "Big 4" and the release of Endgame the previous year. Meanwhile, Greg Prato of Allmusic, while giving the album 3.5/5 stars, critiqued the band for replicating the structure of the studio tracks too closely.

Track listing
All tracks from Rust in Peace unless otherwise noted; all music and lyrics by Mustaine unless otherwise noted

Personnel 

Megadeth
Dave Mustaine – guitars, lead vocals
Chris Broderick – guitars, backing vocals
David Ellefson – bass, backing vocals
Shawn Drover – drums, percussion

Production
 Directed by Kerry Asmussen (DVD/Blu-ray)
 Producered by Mark Adelman, Bob Emmers and Bart Peters (CD)
 Mixed by Ryan Greene, assisted by Masaki Marashita (CD)
 Engineered by Frans Vermast (CD)
 Mastered by Stephen Marsh (CD)

Charts

Albums charts

Video charts

See also
 Countdown to Extinction: Live

References 

Megadeth live albums
2010 live albums
2010 video albums
Live video albums
Live thrash metal albums
Shout! Factory live albums
Shout! Factory video albums